The Lamont–Doherty Earth Observatory (LDEO) is the scientific research center of the Columbia Climate School, and a unit of The Earth Institute at Columbia University.

History 
The Lamont–Doherty Earth Observatory (LDEO) was established in 1949 as the Lamont Geological Observatory on the weekend estate of Thomas W. and Florence Haskell Corliss Lamont, which was donated to the university for that purpose. The Observatory's founder and first director was Maurice "Doc" Ewing, a seismologist who is credited with advancing efforts to study the solid Earth, particularly in areas related to using sound waves to image rock and sediments beneath the ocean floor. He was also the first to collect sediment core samples from the bottom of the ocean, a common practice today that helps scientists study changes in the planet's climate and the ocean's thermohaline circulation.

In 1969, the Observatory was renamed Lamont–Doherty in honor of a major gift from the Henry L. and Grace Doherty Charitable Foundation; in 1993, it was renamed the Lamont–Doherty Earth Observatory in recognition of its expertise in the broad range of Earth sciences. Lamont–Doherty Earth Observatory is Columbia University's Earth sciences research center and is a core component of the Earth Institute, a collection of academic and research units within the university that together address complex environmental issues facing the planet and its inhabitants, with particular focus on advancing scientific research to support sustainable development and the needs of the world's poor.

To support its research and the work of the broader scientific community, Lamont–Doherty operates the  research vessel, the R/V Marcus Langseth, which is equipped to undertake a wide range of geological, seismological, oceanographic and biological studies. Lamont–Doherty also houses the world's largest collection of deep-sea and ocean-sediment cores as well as many specialized research laboratories.

Mission statement 
The Lamont–Doherty Earth Observatory at Columbia University is one of the world's leading research centers developing fundamental knowledge about the origin, evolution and future of the natural world. More than 300 research scientists and students study the planet from its deepest interior to the outer reaches of its atmosphere, on every continent and in every ocean. From global climate change to earthquakes, volcanoes, nonrenewable resources, environmental hazards and beyond, Observatory scientists provide a rational basis for the difficult choices facing humankind in the planet's stewardship.

Major achievements 
Among the many contributions Lamont–Doherty scientists have made to understanding of the Earth system over the years, they:
 Provided the first definitive evidence to support the theory of plate tectonics and continental drift
 First explained the role of large-scale ocean circulation systems in abrupt climate change
 Provided the first evidence that the Earth's inner core is spinning faster than the rest of the planet
 First to systematically study and first to create a global bathymetric map of the oceans
 Demonstrated that changes in the Earth's past climate were linked to changes in the planet's rotation and orbit as well as the sun's output
 Made the first successful prediction of extreme weather associated with an El Niño event
 First to detect nuclear explosions using seismometers and continue monitoring work as part of the Comprehensive Nuclear Test Ban Treaty
 Developed the first lunar seismometers and conducted some of the earliest analyses of the moon's structure and tectonic activity

Major divisions

Biology and paleo environment 
The Division of Biology and Paleo Environment (BPE) includes oceanographers, geologists, geochemists, biologists and environmental scientists who pursue research in two connected efforts. First, because all biological organisms record the environment in which they exist, BPE scientists use biology to uncover clues about earth's past environment. They also attempt to understand how modern environmental conditions affect present-day biology. To do this, BPE scientists turn to a number of primary sources, including deep-sea sediment cores (and the fossils of phytoplankton and zooplankton they contain), samples from coral reefs, and growth rings of trees.

Geochemistry 
Researchers in the Division of Geochemistry study the processes, past and present, that have governed Earth's many environments. Using chemical and isotopic analyses, division scientists study samples of air, water, biological remains, rocks and meteorites in order to address a broad range of scientific issues, ranging from the particulate and chemical pollutants emitted by the collapse of the World Trade Center, to changes in Earth's past climate, to the fundamental chemical processes involved in the differentiation and formation of the planet's mantle and core.

Marine geology and geophysics 
As its name implies, scientists in the Division of Marine Geology and Geophysics (MG&G) are primarily concerned with studying the structure and evolution of the Earth's seafloor. To do so, they employ tools that include side-scan sonar and multi-channel seismic imaging to map the surface and sub-surface, as well as satellite-based remote sensing. An early success of MG&G researchers was the discovery of seafloor spreading, which led to the general acceptance of plate tectonics as the broad foundation for understanding earthquake generation. Other MG&G scientists study the interface between ice sheets and bedrock, sediment transport in the Hudson River, and meteorite impacts in the deep ocean.

Ocean and climate physics 
The Division of Ocean and Climate Physics (OCP) focuses on the links between Earth's climate system and its oceans, including interactions involving the atmosphere, ocean circulation, planetary volcanism, the cryosphere, the biosphere and external forces such as variability of solar radiation and even the occasional asteroid impact.

Scientists are also increasingly interested in understanding the nature of past and present changes to Earth's climate—whether abrupt or gradual, regional or global—and the potential for human activities to influence the natural system.

Division of seismology, geology and tectonophysics 
The researchers in the Seismology, Geology and Tectonophysics Division (SGT) study theoretical and observational seismology, solid Earth dynamics, rock mechanics, structural geology and tectonics, and sedimentary geology. They also contribute to understanding of earthquakes; the structure of Earth's crust, mantle, and core; and the large-scale motions and deformation of the tectonic plates. In addition, the division operates several facilities for the scientific community. In partnership with the U.S. Geological Survey, SGT operates a network of seismographs throughout the northeastern U.S., supports National Science Foundation (NSF) efforts to conduct ocean-bottom seismology research, and provides accurate earthquake source mechanisms to government and academic researchers around the world.

Office of Marine Operations and R/V Marcus G. Langseth 
The history of Lamont–Doherty's seagoing research began in 1953 with the acquisition of the R/V Vema and the formation of a group within the Observatory to organize and support research missions. Today, the Office of Marine Operations oversees geophysical and oceanographic studies on board the Observatory's latest research vessel, the R/V Marcus Langseth, and conducts its own research on the character and operation of various geophysical imaging systems employed by the scientific community.

Department of Earth and Environmental Sciences 

The Department of Earth and Environmental Sciences (DEES) is the educational arm of Columbia University located on the Lamont–Doherty campus to train graduate and undergraduate students enrolled at the university and at Barnard College. The Lamont–Doherty office of DEES primarily supports the department's graduate program, though many undergraduate students take classes and conduct research at the Observatory. At any given time, between 80 and 90 Ph.D. students are working towards degrees in specialties that include aqueous geochemistry, atmospheric science, climate science, ecophysiology, geology, paleoclimatology, paleontology, physical oceanography, solid Earth geophysics, and solid Earth geochemistry. Specific programs at Lamont–Doherty are conducted with many education-affiliates at Columbia and elsewhere in the New York metro area..

Major facilities and initiatives

Core Repository 
The Lamont–Doherty Core Repository is both an archive of sediment and rocks from on and beneath the ocean floor and an archive of digital data pertaining to the material. The repository contains more than 72,000 meters of core, from every ocean and sea, and many other samples. They are used to study Earth's climate and environment, in other research areas, and for educational purposes.

Tree Ring Lab 
The Tree-Ring Lab (TRL) is dedicated to the application of tree-ring research around the world to improve understanding of Earth's past climate and environmental history. Current research concentrates on the use of tree-ring data networks to study regional climate, global climate teleconnections and anthropogenic impacts on tree growth, and on developing new quantitative techniques.

Ocean Bottom Seismology Lab 
The Ocean Bottom Seismology (OBS) Lab develops and operates instruments used to measure deformation of the ocean floor in cooperation with the NSF's National Ocean Bottom Seismograph Instrumentation Pool (OBSIP). These instruments permit the study of such phenomena as seafloor spreading and the formation of new crust, convective and hydrothermal processes beneath the seafloor, and the fate of subducting slabs.

Lamont Cooperative Seismographic Network 
The Lamont–Doherty Cooperative Seismographic Network (LCSN) operates 40 seismographic stations in seven states—Connecticut, Delaware, Maryland, New Jersey, New York, Pennsylvania and Vermont—to monitor earthquakes occurring primarily in the eastern U.S. The network is an active member of the Advanced National Seismic System (ANSS), which is a key input to the USGS National Seismic Hazard Maps. It also provides professional development among station operators.

Databases and repositories 
Lamont–Doherty is home to a wide range of geophysical databases and repositories that aid in scientific research, education and outreach. Many of the databases are available online, and the repositories of physical samples, which are open to access by researchers and students from around the world, also make an increasing portion of their holdings available digitally.

Transportation
Lamont is served by the Lamont Shuttle of Columbia Transportation. Coach USA Rockland Coaches Route 9/9A/9T stops at the front entrance. Transport of Rockland’s 92 and 97 routes stop
in Tappan, New York, 3 miles away from the warehouse.

See also
 Allan Bé, micropaleontologist who worked at the lab
 The Center for Climate and Life, located at Lamont–Doherty
 Wet-bulb conditions

References

External links
  
 Lamont–Doherty Earth Observatory Website

Columbia University
Geology organizations
Buildings and structures in Rockland County, New York
Columbia University research institutes